The Michael Klunk Farmstead is a historic farm located on Crater Creek Road south of Kampsville in Calhoun County, Illinois. The farm consists of a well-preserved house and barn. Michael Klunk, an immigrant from Alsace-Lorraine, established the farm and built the barn in 1830; the north crib of the barn served as a farmhouse until the present house was completed in 1875. The barn is a log double crib barn, while the house has a central hall plan; both designs were common vernacular building types in central and southern Illinois.

The farm was added to the National Register of Historic Places on June 23, 1982.

References

Farms on the National Register of Historic Places in Illinois
Houses completed in 1875
Buildings and structures in Calhoun County, Illinois
National Register of Historic Places in Calhoun County, Illinois